is a passenger railway station located in the city of Iruma, Saitama, Japan, operated by the private railway operator Seibu Railway.

Lines

Station layout
The station consists of two ground-level side platforms serving two tracks, with a bidirectional centre track in between the two platform tracks for use by out-of-service trains.

Platforms

History

The station opened on 15 April 1915.

Station numbering was introduced on all Seibu Railway lines during fiscal 2012, with Bushi Station becoming "SI24".

Passenger statistics
In fiscal 2019, the station was the 67th busiest on the Seibu network with an average of 10,879 passengers daily. The passenger figures for previous years are as shown below. Bushi station was the only station on the Ikebukuro-Hannō section of the Seibu Ikebukuro Line to see a decrease in the number of users between fiscal 2012 and 2013. The passenger figures for previous years are as shown below.

Surrounding area

 Musashino Academia Musicae Iruma Campus
 Musashino Academia Musicae High School
 Iruma Seibu Junior High School
 Iruma Bushi Elementary School

See also
 List of railway stations in Japan

References

External links

  

Railway stations in Saitama Prefecture
Railway stations in Japan opened in 1915
Seibu Ikebukuro Line
Iruma, Saitama